= OOCSS =

Object-oriented CSS (OOCSS) is a CSS methodology developed and promoted by Nicole Sullivan.

The focus of OOCSS is the idea of treating page elements as objects, giving all these objects classes, treating objects’ classes as single entities in style sheets, and taking it from there.
